Max Bergunker (March 3, 1885, in Mykolaiv, Russian Empire - July 8, 1969, in Brooklyn) was a Russian-born American film score composer, known for his score on films such as The Patriot (1928), Chinatown Nights (1929), and Fighting Caravans (1931). He emigrated to the United States in 1924, and was naturalised as an American citizen in 1929.

References 

1885 births
1969 deaths
American film score composers
American male composers
Musicians from the Russian Empire
Soviet emigrants to the United States